The Battle of the Mimbres River was a surprise attack launched by a troop of American militia against an encampment of Chiricahua Apaches along the western shore of the Mimbres River.

On December 4, 1860, a force of thirty armed miners led by James Henry Tevis attacked at sunrise, claiming it was retaliation for stolen livestock. The surprised Apaches, led by Mangas Coloradas, were quickly defeated in a short close quarters action. Four warriors were killed, and an unknown number were wounded. The settlers' casualties are unknown, if any at all. Thirteen women and children were captured and several warriors fled, leaving their families behind. Mangas Coloradas survived. The Americans recovered some of their livestock.

See also
American Indian Wars
Capture of Tucson (1862)

References

Cochise, Ciyé "The First Hundred Years of Nino Cochise"  New York: Pyramid Books 1972
Lavender, David. The Rockies. Revised Edition. N.Y.: Harper & Row, 1975.
Limerick, Patricia Nelson. The Legacy of Conquest: The Unbroken Past of the American West. N.Y.: W.W. Norton, 1987.

Williams, Albert N. Rocky Mountain Country. N.Y.: Duell, Sloan & Pearce, 1950.

Native American history of New Mexico
Mimbres River
Mimbres River
New Mexico Territory
Mimbres River
the Mimbres River
December 1860 events